Simpson River, in Kootenay National Park, is a tributary of Vermilion River flowing through Simpson Valley. Named tributaries include the North Simpson River, Surprise Creek, Lachine Creek, and Verdant Creek.

Simpson River is named for Sir George Simpson who first visited the area in 1841.

References
 Historic Milestones of Kootenay National Park
 Trails into the Core Area of Mount Assiniboine
 BC Names/GeoBC entry "Simpson River"

Rivers of British Columbia
East Kootenay
Rivers of the Canadian Rockies